Claude Houben (born 1926) was a Belgian bobsledder who competed in the late 1940s. He won the silver medal in the four-man event at the 1947 FIBT World Championships in St. Moritz. He was the son of Max Houben. He died on 10 October 2009.

References
Bobsleigh four-man world championship medalists since 1930
Retrospective on Max Houben

Belgian male bobsledders
1926 births
2009 deaths